Marvin Conrad Elliott (born 15 September 1984) is a Jamaican football midfielder who plays for Kingstonian.

Club career

Millwall
After coming up through the Millwall academy, Elliott made his first appearance on 16 April 2003 against Nottingham Forest. If needed, he can be an emergency right back, and he was used in this role against Manchester United in the 2004 FA Cup Final when usual right back, Kevin Muscat was unavailable due to injury.

Bristol City
He signed for Bristol City on 30 July 2007. After a successful first season with Bristol City, Elliott established himself as a popular member of the squad and impressed his fellow professionals as well, being named in the P.F.A Team of the Year alongside teammate Bradley Orr. He also won Bristol City's 'Young Player of The Year' award in his first year at the club.

In The summer of 2009, the 24-year-old was a target for several Premier League clubs, including Fulham, Wolves, Blackburn, Portsmouth and West Brom – who had a bid rejected in January. He subsequently signed a new 3-year deal which would keep him at Bristol City until the end of the 2011–12 Football League Championship. On 21 February 2012, Elliott snapped his Achilles during a training session ruling him out for the rest of the season. Manager Derek McInnes said in an interview We're absolutely devastated for the lad. "It's a massive blow and Marvin was desperate to play his part in keeping us in the Championship. "It happened in training, right near the end of the session today. He was running for the ball with no one near him, there was no contact with anyone. He just pulled up in a lot of pain and you knew it was serious.

"He's had it checked out and the only positive is that he won't require surgery. He'll be back in four months for pre-season and we'll be doing all we can to be a Championship club for when he returns."

After an injury hit 2013–14 season, Elliot was released by Bristol City at the end of the season.

Crawley Town
Elliott joined Crawley Town on a monthly contract on 18 September 2014.

Whitehawk
After a spell out of the game while working as a stockbroker, Elliott signed for National League South club Whitehawk in October 2017.

Kingstonian
On 11 November 2017, Elliott signed for Isthmian League side Kingstonian.

International

Elliot made his international debut for Jamaica against Honduras on 11 October 2011. On 23 March 2013, Marvin Elliott made his third appearance and scored his first international goal for Jamaica in their 2014 World Cup qualifier against Panama. The game finished 1–1.

International goals
Scores and results list Nation's goal tally first.

Career statistics

Club

International

Honours

Club
Millwall
FA Cup runner-up: 2003–04

Individual
Bristol City
Member of PFA Team of the Year: 2008

References

External links

1984 births
Living people
Footballers from Wandsworth
Black British sportspeople
Association football midfielders
English footballers
Millwall F.C. players
Bristol City F.C. players
Crawley Town F.C. players
Whitehawk F.C. players
Kingstonian F.C. players
English Football League players
Jamaican footballers
Jamaica international footballers
English sportspeople of Jamaican descent
People educated at Ernest Bevin College
FA Cup Final players